Eilika Duchess of Oldenburg (née Eilika Helene Jutta Clementine Duchess of Oldenburg; born 22 August 1972) is the wife of Georg von Habsburg, the third in the line of succession to the former Austro-Hungarian throne. By birth she is the member of the House of Oldenburg, while by marriage she became a member of the House of Habsburg.

Early life and ancestry
She is a daughter of Johann, Duke of Oldenburg (b. 1940) and his wife Ilka, Countess of Ortenburg (b.1942). Her father is a younger son of Nikolaus, Hereditary Grand Duke of Oldenburg and his wife, Princess Helena of Waldeck and Pyrmont, while her mother is the third child of Count Alfred of Ortenburg (1906-1970) and his wife, Jutta von Lücken (1906-1991).

Marriage

Wedding ceremony
On 18 October 1997, Eilika married Georg von Habsburg in St. Stephen's Basilica in Budapest, Hungary. He is the younger son of Otto von Habsburg (himself a son of the deposed Emperor Charles I of Austria) and his wife Princess Regina of Saxe-Meiningen. Among the wedding guests were Felipe, Prince of Asturias, Prince Albert of Monaco, and Hassan II of Morocco. Pope John Paul II sent his best wishes to the couple, and ambassadors of many foreign nations, including the United States, attended as representatives. The 25-year-old Eilika wore gold and pearl Oldenburg family tiara, a high-necked white dress, along with a veil worn by her great-grandmother Duchess Elisabeth Alexandrine of Mecklenburg-Schwerin in 1896. The ceremony was broadcast live on Hungarian television; roughly 2,000 Hungarian citizens and tourists gathered outside the church to witness the wedding.

Their wedding was the first union between the Catholic Habsburgs and Lutheran Oldenburgs in their families' histories (Archduchess Isabella of Austria married Oldenburg King Christian II of Denmark before the Reformation) and the first marriage between members of the houses of Habsburg and Oldenburg since the wedding of Archduke Joseph and Grand Duchess Alexandra Pavlovna of Russia, herself a member of the House of Holstein-Gottorp-Romanov, a branch of the Oldenburgs. It was also the second time that a Habsburg was married in Hungary since the fall of communism in 1989.

Issue
The couple have three children:
 Zsófia Mária Tatjána Mónika Erzsébet Katalin (Sophie Maria Tatiana Monica Elisabeth Catherine, born 12 January 2001 in Budapest)
 Ildikó Mária Walburga (Hilda Maria Walburga, born 6 June 2002 in Budapest)
 Károly-Konstantin Mihály István Mária (Karl-Konstantin Michael Stephan Maria, born 20 July 2004 in Budapest)

Ancestry

References

Duchesses of Oldenburg
House of Habsburg-Lorraine
Austrian princesses
German Lutherans
1972 births
Living people
People from Segeberg